Crosseola is a genus of minute sea snail or micromollusc, a marine gastropod mollusc in the family Conradiidae.

Species
Species within the genus Crosseola include:
 
 Crosseola anodyna  Rubio & Rolán, 2019
 Crosseola axialis  Rubio & Rolán, 2019
 Crosseola bellula (A. Adams, 1865)
 Crosseola benedotata  Rubio & Rolán, 2019
 Crosseola bollonsi Dell, 1956
 Crosseola brasiliensis  Rubio & Rolán, 2017
 Crosseola cancellata (Tenison Woods, 1878)
 Crosseola caribbeae  Rubio & Rolán, 2017
 Crosseola catenata  Rubio & Rolán, 2019
 Crosseola concinna (Angas, 1868)
 Crosseola cuvieriana (Mestayer, 1919)
 Crosseola delicata  Rubio & Rolán, 2019
 Crosseola dentata  Rubio & Rolán, 2019
 Crosseola distorta  Rubio & Rolán, 2019
 † Crosseola emilyae Laws, 1950
 Crosseola errata Finlay, 1927
 Crosseola escondida (Poppe, Tagaro & Goto, 2018)
 Crosseola favosa Powell, 1937)
 Crosseola foveolata (Barnard, 1963)
 Crosseola gorii Rubio & Rolán, 2014
 † Crosseola henryi Laws, 1950 
 Crosseola indigaxial   Rubio, Rolán & Gori, 2019
 Crosseola intercalaris  Rubio & Rolán, 2019
 Crosseola intertexta Powell, 1937)
 Crosseola inverta (Hedley, 1907)
 Crosseola latumlabrum  Rubio & Rolán, 2019
 Crosseola madagascariensis  Rubio & Rolán, 2017
 Crosseola mayottensis  Rubio & Rolán, 2019
 Crosseola microstriata  Rubio & Rolán, 2019
 Crosseola minireticula  Rubio & Rolán, 2019
 † Crosseola munditia Laws, 1936 
 Crosseola occlusa  Rubio & Rolán, 2019
 Crosseola ordinata  Rubio & Rolán, 2017
 Crosseola osgrandis  Rubio & Rolán, 2019
 † Crosseola princeps (Tate, 1890) 
 † Crosseola proerrata Finlay, 1930
 Crosseola prosoclina  Rubio & Rolán, 2019
 Crosseola pseudocollonia Powell, 1957
 † Crosseola semiornata Tate 1893 
 Crosseola serrata   Rubio, Rolán & Gori, 2019
 Crosseola sexlata  Rubio & Rolán, 2019
 Crosseola similiter  Rubio & Rolán, 2017
 † Crosseola sinemacula Laws, 1939 
 Crosseola solomonensis  Rubio & Rolán, 2017
  Crosseola striata (Watson, 1883) 
 † Crosseola sultan Finlay, 1930
 Crosseola solomonensis  Rubio & Rolán, 2017
 † Crosseola tenuisculpta Laws, 1936 
 Crosseola uniformis  Rubio, Rolán & Gori, 2019
 † Crosseola waitotara Laws, 1940

Species brought into synonymy
 Crosseola cookiana Dell, 1952: synonym of Lodderia eumorpha cookiana (Dell, 1952) (original combination)
 Crosseola marquesensis Rubio, Rolán & Letourneux, 2017: synonym of Crossolida marquesensis (Rubio, Rolán & Letourneux, 2017) (original combination)
 Crosseola naticoides Iredale, T. & McMichael, D.F. 1962: synonym of Cirsonella naticoides (Hedley, 1907)
 Crosseola vesca (Finlay, 1927): synonym of Dolicrossea vesca Finlay, 1926

References

 Powell A. W. B., New Zealand Mollusca, William Collins Publishers Ltd, Auckland, New Zealand 1979 
 Discover Life
 ZipCodeZoo
 TePapa

External links
 New Zealand Cenozoic Mollusca: Crosseola
 Iredale, T. (1924). Results from Roy Bell's molluscan collections. Proceedings of the Linnean Society of New South Wales. 49: 179-278

 
Extant Miocene first appearances
Gastropod genera